The United Pasokmomogun Kadazan Organisation (abbrev: UPKO) was a Kadazan-Dusun-Murut (KDM) based political party in North Borneo and later Sabah at the time it became a state of Malaysia in the 1960s.

History

Formation of United National Kadazan Organisation (1961)
The party was initially started as the United National Kadazan Organisation (UNKO) which was founded by Donald Stephens in 1961, with its core constituency of indigenous Sabahans. UNKO modeled after United Malays National Organisation (UMNO) in Malaya; was the first indigenous party in Sabah formed to represent the interests of the Kadazandusun community in Sabah. At the time of its founding it had approximately 20,000 members.

Breakaway of United Pasok Momogun Organisation (1962)
The new party UNKO has members which does not support the "Malaysia project" and disagrees with Donald Stephens, hence they split to form a new group led by G. S. Sundang going on to form the United Pasok Momogun Organisation (UPMO) in January 1962.

Reunification and formation of United Pasokmomogun Kadazan Organisation (1963-1964)
Upon the formation of Malaysia in 1963, UNKO entered into a Sabah Alliance coalition with the United Sabah National Organisation (USNO), a Muslim party, and the Sabah Chinese Association (SCA) to form a consociationalism new Government of Sabah; with its president Stephens became the state's first Chief Minister. In May 1964, the breakaway UPMO party, eventually reunited with its parent party. The merger saw UNKO renamed itself as the United Pasokmomogun Kadazan Organisation (UPKO) in June 1964.

Dissolution and merger into United Sabah National Organisation (1967)
After Stephens was forced out of the chief ministership in 1964 and became a federal minister., the party was dissolved on 28 December 1967 and absorbed into United Sabah National Organisation (USNO).

General election results

State election results

See also
Politics of Malaysia
List of political parties in Malaysia
Sabah Democratic Party (PDS) 
United Pasokmomogun Kadazandusun Murut Organisation (UPKO) (New)

References

Defunct political parties in Sabah
1961 establishments in North Borneo
Political parties established in 1961
1967 disestablishments in Malaysia
Political parties disestablished in 1967
Indigenist political parties
Ethnic political parties